Edith Hannah Gostick (née Thomas; January 15, 1894 – July 8, 1984) was a provincial level politician from Alberta, Canada. She served as a member of the Legislative Assembly of Alberta as a representative from the electoral district of Calgary from 1935 to 1940.

Political career
Gostick ran for a seat as a Social Credit Party of Alberta candidate in the Alberta Legislature in the 1935 Alberta general election. She was declared elected on the 18th vote count, taking the fourth seat in the Legislature. Gostick ran for re-election in the 1940 general election but was defeated.

Her son Ron Gostick was a well-known publisher of anti-Semitic and far right literature.

References

External links
Legislative Assembly of Alberta Members Listing

Alberta Social Credit Party MLAs
1894 births
1984 deaths
People from Porth
Welsh emigrants to Canada
Women MLAs in Alberta